This is a list of rulers and officials of the Kingdom of Galicia and Lodomeria, a state under the Habsburg monarchy from 1772 to 1918. From the Partitions of Poland starting in September 1772 up to the fall of Austria-Hungary in 1918, the province was directly subordinate to the Emperors of Austria and the government in Vienna, and then a local Galicia Diet in Lemberg, hence the list includes governors, ministers and other people in charge of the local administration.

Monarchs

Maria Theresa (1772–1780)
Joseph II (1780–1790)
Leopold II (1790–1792)
Francis I (1792 – 2 March 1835)
Ferdinand I (2 March 1835 – 2 December 1848)
Francis Joseph I (2 December 1848 – 21 November 1916)
Charles I (21 November 1916 – 11 November 1918)

Governors
 Count Johann Anton von Pergen (September 1772 – January 1774)
 Count András Hadik (January 1774 – June 1774)
 Heinrich Auersperg (June 1774 – June 1780)
 Józef Brigido (June 1780 – October 1794)
 Józef Szekely (October 1794 – July 1795)
 Jan Gaisruck (July 1795 – February 1801)
 Count Josef von Sweerts-Sporck (February 1801 – August 1801), acting
 Baron Józef von Úrményi (September 1801 – July 1806)
 Christian Wurmser (July 1806 – March 1809), acting
 Peter Goëss (March 1810 – April 1815)
 Georg Oechsner (April 1815 – July 1815), acting
 Baron Joseph von Hauer (August 1815 – November 1822), acting til September 1817
 Count Ludwig Taafe (November 1822 – August 1826)

Governors-general
 Prince August von Lobkowitz (August 1826 – September 1832)
 Archduke Ferdinand (September 1832 –  July 2, 1846)
 Baron Franz von Hochfelden (July 1846 – August 1847), acting
 Count Franz Stadion von Warthausen und Thannhausen (August 1, 1847 – June 1848)
 Baron Wilhelm von Hammerstein (June 1848 – July 1848)
 Count Agenor Gołuchowski, acting
 Wacław Michał Zaleski (July 30, 1848 – January 15, 1849)
 Count Agenor Gołuchowski (January 15, 1849 – December 13, 1859), 1st time
 Baron Joseph von Kalchberg (1859–1860), acting
 Karl von Mosch (1860–1861), acting
 Count Alexander Mensdorff-Pouilly (1861 – October 27, 1864)
 Baron Franz von Paumgarten (1864 – October 19, 1866)
 Count Agenor Gołuchowski (October 20, 1866 – October 7, 1867), 2nd time
 Baron Ludwik Choborski (1867–1871), acting
 Count Agenor Gołuchowski (July 20, 1871 –  August 3, 1875), 3rd time
 Count Alfred Potocki von Piława (November 24, 1875 – August 10, 1883)
 Filip Zaleski (August 10, 1883 – September 1888)
 Count Kazimierz Badeni (October 1888 – September 1895)
 Prince Eustachy Stanisław Sanguszko (September 25, 1895 – March 1898)
 Count Leon Piniński (March 31, 1898 – June 1903)
 Count Andrzej Potocki (June 8, 1903 – April 12, 1908)
 Michał Bobrzyński (April 28, 1908 – May 14, 1913)
 Witold Korytowski (May 14, 1913 – August 20, 1915)
  General Government of Galicia and Bukovina (September 1914 – 1915)
 Hermann von Colard (August 1915 –  April 8, 1916)
 Baron Erich von Diller (April 1916 – March 1917), exiled due to Russian occupation
  General Government of Galicia and Bukovina (1916 – July 26, 1917)
 Count Karl Georg Huyn (1917 –  November 1, 1918), in fact subordinate to the Regency Council and its General Commissar Prince Witold Czartoryski.

Military Governors

Napoleonic Wars 
 Count Heinrich von Bellegarde (1806–1808), 1st time
 N/A (1808–1809)
 Count Heinrich von Bellegarde (1809–1813), 2nd time
 Baron Michael von Klienmayr (1813–1814)

World War I

 Georgy Aleksandrovich Bobrynski (September 1914 – 1915), first Russian occupation
 Fyodor Fyodorovich Trepov, Jr. (October 4, 1916 – July 26, 1917), second Russian occupation
 Dmytro Doroshenko

Marshals of the Galician Diet
After Galicia received autonomy in 1861, much of the power was shifted to a local parliament, the Galicia Diet based in Lemberg (Lviv). Along with the Polish parliamentary tradition, the chairman of the parliament was named marshal.

 Prince Leon Sapieha (April 11, 1861 – March 19, 1875)
 Duke Alfred Potocki von Piława (March 19 – December 1875)
 Duke Włodzimierz Dzieduszycki (March 7, 1876 – 1876)
 Duke Ludwik Wodzicki (August 8, 1877 – 1881)
 Mikołaj Zyblikiewicz (September 14, 1881 –  November 6, 1886)
 Duke Jan Tarnowski (November 18, 1886 – 1890)
 Prince Eustachy Sanguszko (October 14, 1890 – September 24, 1895)
 Duke Stanisław Badeni (October 31, 1895 – October 7, 1901), 1st time
 Duke Andrzej Potocki von Piława  (October 9, 1901 – 1903)
 Duke Stanisław Badeni (June 26, 1903 – June 1912), 2nd time
 Adam Gołuchowski von Gołuchowo (1913 – April 15, 1914)
 Stanisław Niezabitowski (May 15, 1914 – November 1918)

Ministers of State
Ministers of State for Galicia, residing in Vienna:

 Kazimierz Grocholski (April 11, 1871 – November 22, 1871), acting
 Josef Unger (November 25, 1871 – April 21, 1873), acting
 Baron Florian Ziemiałkowski (April 21, 1873 – October 11, 1888)
 Filip Zaleski (October 11, 1888 – November 12, 1892)
 N/A (November 12, 1892 – November 11, 1893)
 Apolinary Jaworski (November 11, 1893 – September 29, 1895)
 Leon Biliński  (September 29, 1895 – January 17, 1897), acting
 Edward Rittner (January 17, 1896 – November 30, 1897)
 Vacant (November 30, 1897 – December 16, 1897)
 Baron Hermann von Loebl (December 16, 1897 – March 5, 1898)
 Adam Jędrzejowicz (March 5, 1898 – October 2, 1899)
 Kazimierz Chłędowski (October 2, 1899 – January 18, 1900)
 Leonard Piętak (January 19, 1900 – May 28, 1906)
 Count Wojciech Dzieduszycki (June 2, 1906 –  November 9, 1907)
 Dawid Abrahamowicz (November 9, 1907 – March 3, 1909)
 Władysław Dulęba (March 3, 1909 – January 9, 1911)
 Count Wacław Zaleski (January 9, 1911 – November 19, 1911)
 Władysław Długosz (November 19, 1911 – December 28, 1913)
 Vacant (December 28, 1913 –  January 2, 1914)
 Zdzisław Karol Dzierżykraj-Morawski (January 2, 1914 – October 21, 1916)
 Michał Bobrzyński (October 31, 1916 – June 23, 1917)
 Juliusz Twardowski (June 23, 1917 – July 25, 1918)
 Kazimierz Gałecki July 26, 1918 – October 30, 1918)

See also
 List of rulers of Austria
 List of rulers of Partitioned Poland

References

External links
The Cambridge Modern History, Vol.10 (free preview) by googlebooks

Lists of European rulers

pl:Władcy Galicji